Charles Augustus Rocke (born 5 October 1800) was an English first-class cricketer who played for Kent, MCC and Cambridge University in six matches from 1822 to 1828, totalling 47 runs with a highest score of 16 and taking 5 victims with 6 wickets.

Rocke was educated at Eton and Jesus College, Cambridge. His later life is not known, but in 1830 he was cited as a "bankrupt" in a notice in The Times. He apparently emigrated in 1849 to Borneo, where his second cousin James Brooke was Rajah of Sarawak.

References

1800 births
Date of death unknown
People educated at Eton College
Alumni of Jesus College, Cambridge
English cricketers
English cricketers of 1787 to 1825
Cambridge University cricketers
Kent cricketers
Marylebone Cricket Club cricketers
Cricketers from Kolkata
Gentlemen cricketers
19th-century sportsmen